Scoundrels is a series of comic adventure novels first published in 2017, by Major Victor Cornwall and Major Arthur St John Trevelyan (the pseudonyms of the authors Duncan Crowe and James Peak, who also feature as the book's unwilling editors). Print copies are published by Black Door Press Ltd, of Fitzrovia, London, and distributed by Turnaround Ltd, of Wood Green, London. Ebooks are published by Farrago Books, an imprint of Prelude Books, Richmond, London.

Scoundrels Volume One 
Scoundrels Volume One was formally distributed to UK bookshops on 29 June 2017, quickly selling out the first edition. A second edition, with minor textual changes, was printed in July 2017. A second printing of the second edition was made available in December 2017 and a third printing of the second edition in February 2018. A third edition, with further minor textual changes, was distributed in November 2018.

Background 
Revolving around the infamous gentlemen's club of Piccadilly, Scoundrels is the memoirs of the disreputable, antagonistic, and unreconstructed Majors Victor Cornwall and St. John Trevelyan. The book relies on a complex conceit: that both Cornwall and Trevelyan were unhappy at the prospect of the other beginning work on an autobiography for fear of their reputation being sullied. As their lives had been so horribly intertwined since their schooldays, the Majors eventually agreed to write a chapter each, in turn, of a joint autobiography. Scoundrels is epistolary - structured as a series of letters between the Majors, within which are chapters from their shared history. These letters contain a great number of astonishing adventures including panda hunting with the last Chinese Emperor, the storming of the Nazi Castle Kung Hammer, and the heist of a Picasso painting.

Scoundrels Volume One aka, 'Scoundrels' covers 1931–1951.

Critical reception 
The book has received universally positive reviews for its humor, lightness of touch, imaginative storylines, and the active relationship between Majors Cornwall and Trevelyan. The Daily Telegraph called it "immensely satisfying... a panda-hunting, Everest-climbing, Nazi-castle- storming adventure." Mark Time, the author of Going Commando, said it was "seriously hilarious. The book I wish I could write. An ingeniously crafted farce that blunderbusses its way around the world in a rollicking mix of absurdity and brilliance." The book has received numerous five-star reviews on amazon.co.uk and many favorable ratings at Waterstones, Foyles, and Goodreads.com.

In August 2017 The Chap Magazine published a full-page review of Scoundrels, by Mark Mason: "The trouble with most spoof biographies is that they don't concentrate enough on the 'biography' aspect. So desperate are they to get you laughing that they throw a million gags in your face, completely forgetting to make the central character interesting or even believable. The core genius of Scoundrels is that its authors have avoided that mistake. Right from page one, you love Major Victor Cornwall and Major Arthur St John Trevelyan, despite - or rather because of- the fact that they're grade one, nailed-on, ocean-going shits... It's the book's exquisite over-the-topness that keeps you coming back for more."

Scoundrels has provoked some interest in the value of "male banter" and about jointjoint-writing enterprises in the Daily Telegraph and The Independent newspapers. The Daily Telegraph reported that "Scoundrels captures the essence of this humor as therapy. It celebrates a blokey, showboating spirit, outrageous boastfulness and sheer idiocy as elements that are vital to male happiness." It quoted Peak as saying: "I'd say humorous at the heart of most male friendships. Some blokes get together to play squash, some go down the pub, others tinker with motorbikes, but a lot of that time they are thinking 'how can I make these idiots laugh?'" and Crowe explains: " getting a laugh from someone is always gratifying – but even more so when you respect their sense of humour. It's a kind of validation. You make another bloke laugh who is your peer and their laughter is a recognition of truth. It's good for the soul."

In July 2017 Peak gave a radio interview on Hannah Murray's The Book Show on Talk Radio Europe about the challenges of writing a novel with a partner in which he revealed that the experience had proved "so enervating" that Scoundrels Volume Two will be published in September 2018.  He also revealed that the authors have planned Cornwall and Trevelyan's life stories as "at least a trilogy" of novels, each to be more surprising, sordid, and hilarious than the last.

Scoundrels Volume Two: The Hunt For Hansclapp 
Scoundrels 'Volume Two: The Hunt For Hansclapp' was published in the UK on September 6, 2018. It continues the narrative of Volume One, covering the Major's adventures during the years 1952–to 1974. The Majors continue to bicker and boast in their letters to each other as they recall kidnapping in the Congo, manslaughter on the Orient Express and romance at the Stasi Christmas Party. 
Volume Two in November was made one of The Spectator Magazine's Books of the Year: "The highlight in fiction was Scoundrels: The Hunt For Hansclapp... Duncan Crowe and James Peak once again pull off the balancing act achieved by only the very best spoofs - making it real enough to be believable, ridiculous enough to be funny." A review in Book Decoder described it as "quirkily funny... hilarious and absurd." One reviewer, Sarah Douglas, wanted "to have a disastrous marriage with this book," describing it as "great fun and perfectly done."

During October to December 2018, Crowe and Peak made appearances at several branches of Waterstones and Foyles in London and the South East of England to sign copies of the books.

In late November 2018, The Hunt For Hansclapp was nominated for the Literary Review's Bad Sex in Fiction Award, for "author(s) who ... produced an outstandingly bad scene of sexual description in an otherwise good novel." Crowe and Peak were reportedly delighted to be considered for this award, which has been previously won by John Updike, AA Gill, Ben Okri, Melvyn Bragg, Tom Wolfe, and Norman Mailer. However, the book was widely recognised by the judges as taking a deliberate tilt at the award (Frank Brinkley of the Literary Review quoted from the book, remarking: "Some of the entries were so over the top as to be almost outrageous.") The Times' Diary reported that: "Scoundrels (was) rejected by the judges as it was too obviously written to win. 'We cheated,' Peak admits. 'We're like a couple of literary Lance Armstrongs.'" The 2018 Bad Sex in Fiction Award went to James Frey for his novel 'Katarina', with Crowe and Peak honoured to collect the award from the pop star Kim Wilde on Frey's behalf.

Scoundrels Volume Three: Her Majesty's Pleasure 
A third novel, entitled 'Volume Three: Her Majesty's Pleasure' completes the Majors' joint autobiography, with, according to Crowe, "a shuddering climax. A right royal rumble at the very heart of the British Establishment." Volume Three was published on December 2, 2021.

After publication Crowe and Peak intend to create a "universe of Scoundrels content" that further explores the club's legacy of solving appalling diplomatic crises that the Crown and Whitehall refuse to touch, from the seventeenth century onwards.

Film & TV Adaptation 
The film and television rights to the Scoundrels novels were acquired by the London film company Rocket Science in October 2019.

Literary Representation 
The Scoundrels novels, Duncan Crowe and James Peak are represented by Charlie Campbell at Greyhound Literary, of London.

References 

2017 British novels
British adventure novels
British comedy novels
Epistolary novels